The 2014–15 LEN Women's Champions' Cup was the 28th edition of LEN's premier competition for women's water polo clubs, running from 15 January 2015 to 25 April 2015. This was the second edition of the new format which saw twenty teams from thirteen countries.

Group stage

Final four

Squads
The final four squads were Kinef Kirishi, Olympiacos, CN Sabadell and UVSE Central.

Kinef Kirishi

Olympiacos

CN Sabadell

UVSE Central

References

LEN Euro League Women seasons
Women, Euro League
2014 in water polo
2015 in water polo
LEN
LEN